William, Will, Bill, or Billy Jordan may refer to:

Politicians
William Jordan (MP for Sandwich) (fl. 1381–1391), Member of Parliament for Sandwich
William Jordan (died 1720), Member of Parliament for Reigate
Hamilton Jordan (William Hamilton Jordan, 1944–2008), American politician, chief of staff to President Carter
William E. Jordan (1883–?), American politician, socialist state legislator from Milwaukee, Wisconsin
Bill Jordan (politician) (1879–1959), New Zealand diplomat and politician, MP and high commissioner
William Worthington Jordan (1849–1886), South African trader, founder of the Boer republic of Upingtonia

Sports
Hen Jordan (William Henry Jordan, 1894–1948), American baseball player
William Jordan (rower) (1898–1968), American Olympic gold medalist rower
Billy Jordan (1908/09–2000), Irish professional footballer
Bill Jordan (Australian footballer) (1906–1995), Australian rules footballer
Bill Jordan (American football), college football player and coach

Writers
Bill Jordan (environmental critic) (born 1944), American journalist
William B. Jordan (1940–2018), American art historian
William Chester Jordan (born 1948), American medieval historian
William George Jordan (1864–1928), American editor and essayist
William Jordan (writer) (fl. 1611), Cornish writer and dramatist

Actors
Will Jordan (born 1927), American actor and impressionist
William Jordan (actor) (born 1937), American television and film actor, star of 1978 television series Project UFO

Others

Bill Jordan (American lawman) (1911–1997), U.S. Marine, Border Patrol officer, gun writer
William-Jordan (died 1109), Crusader baron
William Jordan, Baron Jordan (born 1936), British economist and trade unionist
Bill Jordan (outdoorsman), American camouflage designer
William H. Jordan (died 1923), American herring merchant from Gloucester, Massachusetts
William Lancelot Jordan (1896–1931), South African WWI flying ace

See also
William Jorden (1923–2009), William John Jorden, American reporter and diplomat
William Jordyn (disambiguation)
William II Jordan (d. 1109), Count of Berga (from 1094), Count of Cerdanya (from 1095), and Regent of the County of Tripoli from 1105.